Joeboy in Mexico is the ninth studio album by American post-punk band Tuxedomoon, released in 1997 by Opción Sónica.

Track listing

Personnel 
Adapted from the Joeboy in Mexico liner notes.
Tuxedomoon
 Steven Brown
 Peter Dachert
 Blaine L. Reininger

Release history

References

External links 
 

1997 albums
Tuxedomoon albums